Mohammad Abbaszadeh (born 9 May 1990) is an Iranian professional footballer who plays as a forward for Persian Gulf Pro League club Tractor.

Career

Early years
Abbaszadeh started his career with Moghavemat Sari. He was part of Moghavemat Sari in Division 2 in 2009–10 Iran Football's 2nd Division. He missed 2010–11 season and failed to signed any club.

Sanat Sari
Mohammad Abbaszadeh joined  Sanat Sari in 1390 and was able to score 6 goals in 22 games

Nassaji Mazandaran
He joined Nassaji in summer 2012 and signed a two-years contract until end of 2013–14 season and was given number 10. He made his debut for Nassaji against Aboomoslem as a starter on September 13, 2012. Abbaszadeh scored 18 times in 23 matches, becoming the league top scorer.

Persepolis

2013–14
After becoming the Azadegan League's top scorer, Abbaszadeh had offers from many teams, most of those in the Pro League who wanted to acquire him. Persepolis offered 125,000 € (4 Billion Rials) up front with an additional equivalent of 1 Billion Rial to be paid in the form of sporting goods from Uhlsport. On the 3 May 2013, he signed a three-year contract with Tehran's reds, Persepolis. He made his debut in a friendly match against Arta Ardabil and scored five goals in five pre-season matches for Persepolis. He scored his first goal for Persepolis in a 2–0 home victory over Sepahan in 2013–14 Iran Pro League. He scored an instrumental goal against Damash Gilan in their 1–0 victory on matchday 28 that kept Persepolis' title hopes alive. However, Persepolis finished second at the end of the season. He finished the season with 5 goals in 13 appearances, scoring in 5 of the last 6 games of the season, averaging a goal every 125 minutes. On 2 August 2014, Abbaszadeh was named the Iran Pro League's best young talent for the 2013–14 season.

2014–15
Abbaszadeh played his first match for Persepolis in 2014–15 season in a 1–1 draw with Naft Tehran at Azadi Stadium. He scored his first goal in this season against Padideh with a penalty kick.

Nassaji Mazandaran 
Mohammad Abbaszadeh joined Mazandaran Mazandaran Nassaji for the second time in 2016. In the first season, he promised Hani Nowruzi, Hadi Nowruzi's son, to score 24 goals in memory of his father. Finally, he was able to score 24 goals in League One. Mohammad Abbaszadeh was the Nassaji captain this season and with his beautiful goals he became especially popular among Mazandaran Nassaji fans and Mazandaran Nassaji fans gave him many titles, including: Mr. Double, Goal machine, Shah Shahi

Club career statistics

Honours
Individual
 Azadegan League Top Goalscorer: 2012–13 (18 goals), 2016–17 (24 goals)
 Azadegan League Player of the season: 2012–13, 2016–17
 Iranian Young Footballer of the Year: 2014

References

External links

Mohammad Abbaszadeh at PersianLeague.com

1990 births
Living people
Iranian footballers
Persian Gulf Pro League players
Azadegan League players
Sanat Sari players
Nassaji Mazandaran players
Persepolis F.C. players
Rah Ahan players
Sportspeople from Mazandaran province
Association football forwards
People from Qaem Shahr